Kronach station is a railway station in the town of Kronach, located in the Kronach district in Upper Franconia, Bavaria, Germany.

References

Railway stations in Bavaria
Buildings and structures in Kronach (district)
Railway stations in Germany opened in 1861
1861 establishments in Bavaria